Electronic Sonata for Souls Loved by Nature is a composed work, originally in fourteen movements—or events as they are denoted by the composer—written by jazz arranger George Russell. The composition is "... meant to suggest that man, in the face of encroaching technology, must confront technology and attempt to humanize it, using it to enrich his collective soul…not only his purse… to explore inner, as well as outer space". It was originally written in 1968, using new compositional techniques associated at the time with contemporary music.

The music is structured around a panstylistic tape of "fragments of many different styles of, avantgarde jazz music, ragas, blues, rock, serial music etc. treated electronically, ... a palate upon which non-electronical musical statements of a panstylistic nature could be projected". Musicologist and jazz critic Max Harrison writes, "it is no mere coincidence that one is reminded of Stockhausen's Telemusik of  1966". The tape had been recorded at EMS (Elektronmusikstudion) in Stockholm and consisted of a collage of sound fragments obtained from various types of music and from various places in the world. He mixed music that was seemingly incompatible both in terms of sound and context. A kind of world music with styles that rub up against each other.

The work was  commissioned by Sveriges Radio and first performed with a sextet in a concert at the Henie Onstad Kunstsenter, outside Oslo, on April 28, 1969. The concert was recorded and released on the Flying Dutchman label with the year of composition, 1968, in the title. This 1969 recording featured Russell with Jan Garbarek, Manfred Schoof, Terje Rypdal, Jon Christensen, and Red Mitchell and was subsequently re-released on Strata-East Records on LP in 1976, and again on the Italian Soul Note label in 1985 (LP and CD).

Russell has revisited the piece twice on record. For a performance of the work in 1970 he added one more event to a total of fifteen. This time he rearranged and recorded the composition with a large orchestra in Stockholm. It was recorded on October 6, 1970. The 1970-recording was released on the Sonet label as part of the album "The Essence of George Russell"  in 1971, and rereleased in 1983 on the Black Lion label. In 1980 George Russell rerecorded the sextet version with Jean-François Jenny-Clark, Victor Comer, Keith Copeland, Robert Moore and Lew Soloff. This time the original 1968 in the title was evidently interpreted as the performance year, and the title of the 1980-recording was extended with its recording year. It was released on Soul Note as an LP in 1980 and CD in 1985.

Track listing
1969 version
 "Events 1-2-3-4-5-6-7" - 25:36
 "Events 8-9-10-11-12-13-14" - 26:13
1970 version
 "Part I" - 15:48 
 "Part II" - 19:51
 "Part III" - 20:53
1980 version
 "Events 1-2-3-4-5-6-7" - 23:45
 "Events 8-9-10-11-12-13-14" - 24:28

Personnel

1969 recording
Jan Garbarek: tenor saxophone
Manfred Schoof: trumpet
Terje Rypdal: electric guitar
Jon Christensen: drums
Red Mitchell: bass
George Russell: piano
Recorded live at the Sonja Henie/Niels Onstad Kunstsenter Oslo, April 28, 1969

1970 recording
Jan Allan, Maffy Falay, Bertil Lövgren, Lars Samuelsson: trumpet
Arne Domnérus: alto saxophone
Claes Rosendahl: soprano, alto and tenor saxophone, flute
Lennart Åberg: soprano and tenor saxophone, flute
Erik Nilsson: baritone saxophone, bass clarinet
Olle Lind: bass trombone
Berndt Egerbladh: vibraphone, xylophone
Bengt Hallberg: piano
Rune Gustafsson: guitar
Georg Riedel: bass
Egil Johansen: drums
Sabu Martinez: congas
George Russell: piano, conductor
Stanton Davis: trumpet, flugelhorn
Jan Garbarek: tenor saxophone
Terje Rypdahl: electric guitar
Arild Andersen: bass
Jon Christensen: drums
Recorded in Stockholm, October 6, 1970

1980 recording
Jean-François Jenny-Clark: bass
Victor Comer: guitar
Keith Copeland: percussion
Robert Moore: saxophones
Lew Soloff: trumpet
George Russell: piano, organ
Recorded June 9 & 10, 1980 at Barigozzi Studio, Milan

References

George Russell (composer) albums
Strata-East Records albums
Black Saint/Soul Note albums
Flying Dutchman Records albums